All Hands is the third official studio album by Minneapolis hip hop collective Doomtree. It was released by Doomtree Records on January 27, 2015. It peaked at number 95 on the Billboard 200 chart.

Critical reception
At Metacritic, which assigns a weighted average score out of 100 to reviews from mainstream critics, All Hands received an average score of 62% based on 5 reviews, indicating "generally favorable reviews".

Track listing

Charts

References

External links
 

2015 albums
Doomtree albums
Doomtree Records albums
Albums produced by Lazerbeak